Charles Guilbert (born 15 May 1972) is a French former professional road cyclist.

Major results

1996
 2nd Overall Ruban Granitier Breton
1st Stage 1
1997
 1st Stage 1 Tour de l'Avenir
 7th Overall Circuit de Lorraine
1998
 2nd Clásica de Sabiñánigo
 5th Overall Tour de Serbie
 8th GP de la Ville de Rennes
1999
 3rd Boucles de l'Aulne
 10th GP Villafranca de Ordizia
2000
 3rd Polynormande
2001
 10th Tour du Doubs
2002
 3rd Paris–Bourges
 5th Grand Prix de la Ville de Lillers
 8th Boucles de l'Aulne
 8th Overall Tour du Limousin
2004
 5th Overall Tour Nord-Isère
 9th Overall Tour de Normandie
2005
 1st Stage 5 Ruban Granitier Breton
 1st  Overall Tour de Gironde
1st Stage 1
 1st Stage 3 Boucles de la Mayenne
 3rd Polymultipliée lyonnaise
 5th Tro-Bro Léon
2006
 3rd Paris–Camembert
 6th Paris–Troyes
2007
 6th Paris–Camembert
 8th Overall Circuit de Lorraine
 10th Paris–Troyes

References

1972 births
Living people
French male cyclists
Sportspeople from Caen
Cyclists from Normandy